Princess Niké Arrighi Borghese, born Marcella Arrighi on 9 March 1947 and known professionally as Nike Arrighi, is a French visual artist and former actress, known for roles in several European horror and art house films in the 1960s and 1970s in addition to work in television.

Early life
Daughter of Italian diplomat and former journalist Count Ernesto Arrighi and Australian prima ballerina and model Eleanora ("Nellie") Douglas Cox, daughter of grazier Douglas Cox, Arrighi was raised in the Vaucluse neighborhood of Sydney, Australia. Her family moved there because her father was the Italian consul. He died when she was young.

Career
Arrighi began her professional career as a fashion model in Paris, then moved to London, where she studied art at the Royal Academy of Dramatic Art. In 1967 she played the parts of Corinne in The Champions (‘Reply Box No.66) and a gypsy girl in The Prisoner (‘Many Happy Returns’). After a ten-year career in film and television she retired in the early 1970s to return to art, which she had studied as a young woman. Specializing in copperplate etching and oil painting, she won First Prize for Graphic Art at the 1976 Hong Kong Art Biennial.

Personal life
In 1977 she married Prince Paolo Borghese. They lived in Hong Kong, where he was an engineer, before moving in 1984 to Italy, where she still resides at Palazzo Borghese in Artena. Her husband died in 1999. They had a daughter, Flavia.

Her sister is Luciana Arrighi.

Filmography

References

1947 births
Living people
French film actresses
French television actresses
French etchers
People from Nice
French women printmakers
21st-century French women artists
Women etchers